Fontwell is an electoral division of West Sussex in the United Kingdom and returns one member to sit on West Sussex County Council. The current County Councillor, Derek Whittington, is also Cabinet Member for Strategic Planning & Transport.

Extent
The division covers the villages of Aldingbourne, Barnham, Binsted, Eastergate, Fontwell, Madehurst, Slindon, Walberton and Westergate.

It comprises the following Arun District wards: Barnham Ward and Walberton Ward; and of the following civil parishes: Aldingbourne, Barnham, Eastergate, Madehurst, Slindon and Walberton.

Election results

2013 Election
Results of the election held on 2 May 2013

2009 Election
Results of the election held on 4 June 2009:

2005 Election
Results of the election held on 5 May 2005:

References
Election Results - West Sussex County Council

External links
 West Sussex County Council
 Election Maps

Electoral Divisions of West Sussex